Pseudodictamnus mediterraneus, the false dittany, is a species of flowering plant in the mint family Lamiaceae. It is native to the southern Aegean region.

Taxonomy 
Several common names are attached to this plant, including false dittany, false divinity, and Greek horehound.

Etymology
The Latin specific epithet pseudodictamnus means "false dittany". In this case, the resemblance is to the classical dittany of Crete, Origanum dictamnus, not to the much more distantly related genus Dictamnus in the family Rutaceae.

Description 

Distribution 
Pseudodictamnus mediterraneus is native to dry Mediterranean regions in Europe and western Asia, including Greece (South Aegean), Egypt, Libya and Turkey. It is also an introduced species in the British Isles and Italy (Sicily).

In horticulture
In cultivation in the UK, this plant has gained the Royal Horticultural Society's Award of Garden Merit.

References

Plants described in 1834
Flora of Greece
Flora of Egypt
Flora of Libya
Lamiaceae